Cragg may refer to:

People
Cragg Hines, (born 1945), American journalish

Surname
Alistair Cragg (born 1980), South African-born Irish long-distance runner
Dan Cragg (born 1939), American writer
Edward "Porky" Cragg (1919–1943), American fighter ace of World War II
Edward Joseph Cragg (1887–1953), civil servant, businessman and political figure in Nova Scotia, Canada
Ernest T. Cragg (1922–2006), American major general, United States Air Force
John Cragg (1767–1854), English ironmaster
J. W. Cragg (1846–1931), English acrobat
Kenneth Cragg (1913–2012), British Anglican priest and scholar
Pat Cragg, New Zealand physiologist
Tony Cragg (born 1949), English artist

Other uses
5068 Cragg, main-belt asteroid
Cragg Vale, a village in Calderdale, West Yorkshire, England

See also
Crag (disambiguation)
Cragg (disambiguation)